Abacetus suborbicollis is a species of ground beetle in the subfamily Pterostichinae. It was described by Straneo in 1965.

References

suborbicollis
Beetles described in 1965